African cassava mosaic virus (ACMV, ICTV approved acronym) is a plant pathogenic virus of the family Geminiviridae that may cause either a mosaic appearance to plant leaves, or chlorosis, a loss of chlorophyll.  In Manihot esculenta (cassava), a highly valuable African food crop, the virus causes severe mosaic.  Cassava is a staple food crop in many places throughout the tropics and subtropics as a source of carbohydrates, but the transmission and severity of disease for cassava in Africa is greatest with ACMV.

Cause
African cassava mosaic virus is transmitted by a whitefly.

See also
 Cassava brown streak virus disease

External links

Begomovirus
Viral plant pathogens and diseases